Mallosia brevipes is a species of beetle in the family Cerambycidae. It was described by Maurice Pic in 1897. It is known from Iran, Armenia, and possibly also Turkey.

References

Saperdini
Beetles described in 1897